, is a trans-Neptunian- and scattered disc object from the outermost region of the Solar System, approximately 117 kilometers in diameter. It was first observed by astronomers during the Outer Solar System Origins Survey at the Mauna Kea Observatories on 24 May 2015.

Description 

This minor planet is one of a small number of detached objects with perihelion distances of 30 AU or more, and semi-major axes of 200 AU or more. Such objects can not reach such orbits without some perturbing object, which lead to the speculation of planet nine.

Based on an absolute magnitude of approximately 7.95 and an assumed albedo of 0.09, the Johnston's Archive calculated a mean-diameter of 117 kilometers.

 is located very near the 1:12 Neptune resonance of 157.8 AU (compared to its 157.2 ± 0.6 AU), meaning that it completes roughly 1 orbit for every 12 orbits Neptune makes.

References

External links 
 List Of Centaurs and Scattered-Disk Objects, Minor Planet Center
 List of known Trans-Neptunian Objects, Johnston's Archive
 
 

Minor planet object articles (unnumbered)
20150524